"Rock-a-Bye Your Baby with a Dixie Melody" is a popular song written by Jean Schwartz, with lyrics by Sam M. Lewis and Joe Young. The song was introduced by Al Jolson in the Broadway musical Sinbad and published in 1918.

Probably the best-known version of the song was by Al Jolson who recorded it on March 13, 1918 and whose version reached No. 1 the same year.

Other recordings
Al Jolson recorded the song on December 20, 1932, with Guy Lombardo and his Royal Canadians. Jolson recorded the song again on March 27, 1946 with an orchestra under the direction of Morris Stoloff.
Arthur Fields - considered to be a No. 9 hit in 1918.
Dean Martin recorded the song on April 28, 1950.
Judy Garland included the song in her album Miss Show Business (1955) and her 1960 recording appeared in the compilation album The London Sessions. The song was also included in her live album Judy at Carnegie Hall (1961).
Jerry Lewis - his version was a Top 10 hit in 1956 and became a gold record.
Sonny Rollins, for his 1959 album Sonny Rollins and the Contemporary Leaders.
Brenda Lee recorded her version of the song for her 1959 album Grandma, What Great Songs You Sang!. 
Connie Francis recorded her rendition of the song, also early in 1959, for her album The Exciting Connie Francis.
Aretha Franklin also recorded a version of this song for her album The Electrifying Aretha Franklin, which reached No. 24 in Cash Box and #37 on the Billboard Hot 100 chart in 1961. 
Bing Crosby recorded the song for the 1965 album Bing Crosby's Treasury - The Songs I Love.
Sammy Davis Jr. - frequently sang it in his live shows, and included it his live album That's All! (1966)
 Nat King Cole
 Cher - from the album Bittersweet White Light
 Mandy Patinkin - from his 1989 album Mandy Patinkin

Film appearances
A Plantation Act (1926) - sung by Al Jolson
The Show of Shows (1929) - sung by Sid Silvers
The Singing Kid (1936) - sung by Al Jolson in the opening medley 
Rose of Washington Square (1939) - performed by Al Jolson
The Merry Monahans (1944) - sung by Donald O'Connor
The Jolson Story (1946) - sung by Al Jolson
Jolson Sings Again (1949) - sung by Al Jolson
Terms of Endearment (1983) - Judy Garland version heard

References 

Aretha Franklin songs
Al Jolson songs
Sammy Davis Jr. songs
Songs from musicals
Songs with music by Jean Schwartz
Songs with lyrics by Sam M. Lewis
Songs with lyrics by Joe Young (lyricist)
1918 songs
Judy Garland songs
Music published by MPL Music Publishing
Songs about the American South